Michael Alphonsus Harrington (15 September 1900 – 1 August 1973) was a Canadian clergyman and bishop for the Roman Catholic Diocese of Kamloops. Harrington was born in Killaloe, Ontario. He became ordained in 1926. He was appointed bishop in 1952. He died on 1 August 1973, at the age of 72.

References

1900 births
1973 deaths
People from Killaloe, Ontario
20th-century Roman Catholic bishops in Canada
Roman Catholic bishops of Kamloops